Mister Pipeline is a title given to masters of the waves at the North Shore's Pipeline. It was first given to Butch Van Artsdalen, and is passed on from generation to generation, by consensus. Other holders of the title have included sometime actor Gerry Lopez and bodyboarding legend Mike Stewart.

Bodyboarding
Surfing in the United States
Surfing in Hawaii